National Highway 751, commonly referred to as NH 751 is a national highway in India. It is a secondary route of National Highway 51.  NH-751 runs in the state of Gujarat in India.

Route 
NH751 will be connecting Ahmeadabad to Dholera SIR and then it will go to Bhavnagar from Dholera, Dholera SIR has 250 Meter wide alignment for the central spine road, NH 751 is access Control Express way and is elevated at most of the junctions it connects  (Nari Junction) near Bhavnagar, Bavaliyari, Dholera, Ambali, Vataman, Chaloda, Bhat, Visalpur and Sardar Patel Ring Road(NH47) near Sarkhej in the state of Gujarat.

Junctions  
 
  Terminal near Bhavnagar.
  near Vataman
  Terminal near Sarkhej.

See also 
 List of National Highways in India
 List of National Highways in India by state

References

External links 

 NH 751 on OpenStreetMap

National highways in India
National Highways in Gujarat